Frank Mitchell Bogert (January 1, 1910 – March 22, 2009) was an American actor, professional rodeo announcer, author, and politician best known as the longtime mayor of Palm Springs, California.

Born in Mesa, Colorado to Henry Kneeland Bogert and Adaline Esther Mitchell, he was raised in the California mountain town of Wrightwood in San Bernardino County.  He was a rodeo buddy and distant relative to cowboy artist Earl W. Bascom.

Bogert arrived in Palm Springs in 1927, becoming the city's first chamber of commerce manager in 1939. In the later 1930s he was the manager of the Palm Springs Racquet Club.

In 1958, Bogert was elected to the Palm Springs City Council, becoming mayor soon after, serving for eight years. He was elected to the position for two more two-year terms in 1982. 

Bogert worked closely with Gene Autry to bring the California Angels to Palm Springs for spring training. In 1987 he wrote a book, Palm Springs: First Hundred Years, a favorite of famous area resident Bob Hope. 

In 1997, a Golden Palm Star on the Palm Springs, California, Walk of Stars was dedicated to him.

Eviction of Blacks and Latinos from Section 14 
As Mayor of Palm Springs in the mid-1960's, Bogert was an advocate for the eviction of non-Native Americans from Section 14, a tract of land held by the Agua Caliente Band of Cahuilla Indians but leased to others. The city directed that the tribe terminate short-term leases granted to them and used city funds to clear the land for redevelopment, including burning the homes. The residents of Section 14 were mostly Black and Latino, and the State of California later called the displacement a "city-engineered holocaust", depriving dozens of Blacks and Latinos of generational wealth.

The Palm Springs Human Relations Commission cited this history, as well as a conflict of interest while Bogert acted as conservator for tribal land which was being demolished by the city, and racist comments regarding the "poor Blacks" who lived in Section 14, as justification for removing a statue of Bogert on horseback placed in 1990 in front of the Palm Springs City Hall. The City Council of Palm Springs ordered its removal in 2021 and formally apologized for the eviction of the Section 14 residents. After legal objections to its removal from Bogert's supporters and family members were rejected by the courts, the statue was relocated on July 13, 2022.

Bibliography

References

External links

 

1910 births
2009 deaths
American actor-politicians
Mayors of Palm Springs, California
Male actors from Palm Springs, California
People from Mesa County, Colorado
20th-century American politicians